Zhu Chaoqing (born 28 February 1995) is a Chinese footballer who currently plays for Beijing Sinobo Guoan in the Chinese Super League.

Club career
Zhu Chaoqing started his professional football career in 2016 when he was loaned to China League Two side Sichuan Longfor from Beijing Sinobo Guoan. He played 19 league matches in the 2016 season; however, Sichuan Longfor failed to promoted to the second tier after losing to Yunnan Lijiang in the Semi-finals of 2016 China League Two Play-offs. He scored his first senior goal on 22 October 2016 in the third-place match which Sichuan lost to Jiangxi Liansheng 3–2.

Zhu returned to Beijing Guoan in 2017 and was promoted to the first team by José González. On 10 August 2017, he made his debut for Beijing in a 2–2 away draw against Tianjin Quanjian, coming on as a substitute for Jiang Tao in the 89th minute. At the end of the 2017 season, Zhu went on to make five appearances for the club in all competitions.

Career statistics

References

External links
 

1995 births
Living people
Chinese footballers
People from Heze
Footballers from Shandong
Beijing Guoan F.C. players
Sichuan Longfor F.C. players
Chinese Super League players
Association football forwards